John Charlton (also Cherleton or Charleton), 4th Baron Charlton of Powys (25 April 1362 – 19 October 1401)

He succeeded to the titles of 4th Baron Cherleton and 4th Lord of Powys (Feudal baron) on 13 July 1374, on the death of his father, John Charleton, 3rd Baron Cherleton, and held the office of Justice of North Wales from 20 March 1387.

He married Alice FitzAlan, daughter of Richard FitzAlan, 11th Earl of Arundel and Elizabeth de Bohun, before March 1392, without issue.

He died on 19 October 1401, aged 39, at Powis Castle, Welshpool. His last will was dated 1395. As he had no children, he was succeeded in the barony and lordship by his younger brother, Edward.

References

1362 births
1401 deaths
Marcher lords
English people of Welsh descent
14th-century English nobility
15th-century English nobility
4